Hilde Koop (26 May 1921 – 22 March 2008) was a German gymnast. She competed in seven events at the 1952 Summer Olympics.

References

1921 births
2008 deaths
German female artistic gymnasts
Olympic gymnasts of Germany
Gymnasts at the 1952 Summer Olympics
Place of birth missing